Unity DAB is a London-based radio station on DAB and online playing house, UK garage and other genres including hip-hop, soul, and funk.

Presenters and DJs include Philgood & Ram, Graham Gold, Huckleberry Finn, Angie Brown, Steve Stritton, Danny Rampling, and Sonique.

References

External links 
 Official website

Radio stations in London
Radio stations established in 2020
House music radio stations
UK garage radio stations
Electronic dance music radio stations in the United Kingdom